The 2010–11 Kuwaiti Premier League season was the 49th since its establishment. The season started in August and finished in April after a 3-month break for the 2011 AFC Asian Cup played in January.

Teams 
Al Salibikhaet and Al Tadamon were relegated to the Kuwaiti Division One league after finishing bottom in the 2009–10 season and relegation playoff respectively.

The two relegated teams were replaced by Kuwaiti Division One champions Al Sahel and playoff winners Al Jahra.

League standing

Promotion/relegation playoff 

Al Salmiya retained Premier League status.

Top goalscorers

References 

Kuwait Premier League seasons
Kuwait
1